The Chatsworth Apartments is an apartment building located in Midtown Detroit, Michigan, within the campus of Wayne State University. It was listed on the National Register of Historic Places in 1986.

Description
The Chatsworth Apartments is a nine-story, L-shaped apartment building, built of reinforced concrete with tan-colored brick and tile. It included an underground parking garage with a sixty-five car capacity – an uncommon feature at the time.

The facade of the Chatsworth is divided into three horizontal sections: a heavier base consisting of the first two floors, a center section of floors 3–8, and the capping of the ninth floor. The first two floors are designed with decorative elements, including white stone at the ground level, orangish tiles, balustrades on the second-story windows, and a clearly defined bracketed cornice above the second floor. The main facade includes three strong vertical bays in the main section (floors 3–8) which stand out as columns.  Gothic-shaped arches top the ninth-story windows, as well as the second-story windows.

Inside, each of floors 3–9 typically contain 10 living units of varying size, with most containing a living room, dining area, kitchen, bedroom, and bathroom.

History
The Chatsworth was built in 1928 for the realty company T.F. Norris Company from a design by the firm of Pollmar, Ropes & Lundy. The apartment building was constructed at a cost of approximately $560,000 to accommodate the influx of residents into Detroit in the 1920s. The original owner was likely Charles A. Gallarno – he certainly owned the land on which the Chatsworth was built, and owned some nearby apartment buildings, but his ownership of the Chatsworth is uncertain.

In 1943, Bondholders Management Inc. acquired the property. As early as 1951, Wayne State University expressed an interest in purchasing the Chatsworth. The University did acquire it in February 1961. As of 2016, the building is owned by Wayne State University, and is used as housing for undergraduate, graduate, and professional students.

The university allows families with children to live in Chatsworth Tower. Residents are zoned to Detroit Public Schools. Zoned schools include DPS Foundation for Early Learners @ Edmonson (K-8), and King High School (9-12).

References

External links
 Chatsworth Tower - Wayne State University

University and college dormitories in the United States
Apartment buildings in Detroit
Residential buildings completed in 1927
Wayne State University
Residential buildings on the National Register of Historic Places in Michigan
1927 establishments in Michigan
National Register of Historic Places in Detroit